Hypericum grandifolium is a species of flowering plant in the St. John's wort family Hypericaceae. It is native to Madeira and the Canary Islands. It is an evergreen shrub up to 1.8 m in height, with dark green, leathery leaves covered with warty glands, and bright yellow flowers up to 4.5 cm broad. It is an important constituent of the shrub layer in the laurisilva of La Gomera.

Hypericum grandifolium has shown analgesic properties in studies on mice.

Its common name in Spanish is malfurada.

References

Further reading
 Bramwell, D & Z. Bramwell. Wild Flowers of the Canary Islands. Stanley Thornes (Publishers) Ltd. 1974.
 Scönfelder, P. & I. Scönfelder. Die Kosmos Kanarenflora. Kosmos. 2005.

grandifolium
Flora of the Canary Islands
Flora of Madeira
Taxa named by Jacques Denys Choisy